Cerithium citrinum is a species of sea snail, a marine gastropod mollusk in the family Cerithiidae.

Description

Distribution
The distribution of Cerithium citrinum includes the Western Pacific.
 Philippines
 Australia
 Kermadec

References

Cerithiidae
Gastropods described in 1855